Hemiliostraca is a genus of sea snails, marine gastropod mollusks in the family Eulimidae.

Species
Species within this genus include the following:

 Hemiliostraca acanthyllis (Watson, 1883)
 Hemiliostraca auricincta (Abbott, 1958)
 Hemiliostraca bahamondei (Rehder, 1980)
 Hemiliostraca clarimaculosa (Raines, 2003)
 Hemiliostraca conspurcata (A. Adams, 1864)
 Hemiliostraca delicata (Pilsbry, 1918)
 Hemiliostraca diauges (Tomlin & Shackleford, 1915)
 Hemiliostraca elegantissima (de Folin, 1867)
 Hemiliostraca fasciata Matsuda, Uyeno & Nagasawa, 2013 
 Hemiliostraca irafca (Bartsch, 1915)
 Hemiliostraca joshuana (Gatliff & Gabriel, 1910)
 Hemiliostraca metcalfei (A. Adams, 1853)
 Hemiliostraca montrouzieri (Souverbie, 1872)
 Hemiliostraca ophiarachnicola Matsuda, Uyeno & Nagasawa, 2013 
 Hemiliostraca peasei (Tryon, 1886)
 Hemiliostraca samoensis (Crosse, 1867)
 Hemiliostraca sloani (Warén, 1980)
 Hemiliostraca sobrina (Laseron, 1955)
 Hemiliostraca vittata (Laseron, 1955)
 Hemiliostraca waltersi (Laseron, 1955)

Species brought into synonymy
 Hemiliostraca distorta (Pease, 1860): synonym of  Hemiliostraca peasei (Tryon, 1886)
 Hemiliostraca osorioae (Raines, 2003): synonym of Subniso osorioae Raines, 2003 
 Hemiliostraca perspicua (Oliver, 1915): synonym of Eulima perspicua (W. R. B. Oliver, 1915)
 Hemiliostraca vitrea (Petterd, 1884): synonym of  Eulima lodderae (Tate MS, Lodder, 1900)

Taxon inquirendum
 Hemiliostraca amamiensis (Habe, 1961)

References

 Warén A. (1984) A generic revision of the family Eulimidae (Gastropoda, Prosobranchia). Journal of Molluscan Studies suppl. 13: 1-96. page(s): 48

External links
 To World Register of Marine Species

Eulimidae